In thermal physics and thermodynamics, the heat capacity ratio, also known as the adiabatic index, the ratio of specific heats, or Laplace's coefficient, is the ratio of the heat capacity at constant pressure to heat capacity at constant volume. The symbol  is used by aerospace and chemical engineers.

 

where  is the heat capacity,  the molar heat capacity (heat capacity per mole), and  the specific heat capacity (heat capacity per unit mass) of a gas. The suffixes  and  refer to constant-pressure and constant-volume conditions respectively.

The heat capacity ratio is important for its applications in thermodynamical reversible processes, especially involving ideal gases; the speed of sound depends on this factor.

To understand this relation, consider the following thought experiment. A closed pneumatic cylinder contains air. The piston is locked. The pressure inside is equal to atmospheric pressure. This cylinder is heated to a certain target temperature. Since the piston cannot move, the volume is constant. The temperature and pressure will rise. When the target temperature is reached, the heating is stopped. The amount of energy added equals , with  representing the change in temperature. The piston is now freed and moves outwards, stopping as the pressure inside the chamber reaches atmospheric pressure. We assume the expansion occurs without exchange of heat (adiabatic expansion). Doing this work, air inside the cylinder will cool to below the target temperature. To return to the target temperature (still with a free piston), the air must be heated, but is no longer under constant volume, since the piston is free to move as the gas is reheated. This extra heat amounts to about 40% more than the previous amount added. Therefore, the heat capacity ratio in this example is 1.4.

Consider the difference between adding heat to the gas with a locked piston and adding heat with a piston free to move, so that pressure remains constant. In the second case, the gas will both heat and expand, causing the piston to do mechanical work on the atmosphere. The heat that is added to the gas goes only partly into heating the gas, while the rest is transformed into the mechanical work performed by the piston. In the first, constant-volume case (locked piston), there is no external motion, and thus no mechanical work is done on the atmosphere;  is used. In the second case, additional work is done as the volume changes, so the amount of heat required to raise the gas temperature (the specific heat capacity) is higher for this constant-pressure case.

Ideal-gas relations 

For an ideal gas, the molar heat capacity is at most a function of temperature, since the internal energy is solely a function of temperature for a closed system, i.e., where  is the amount of substance in moles. In thermodynamic terms, this is a consequence of the fact that the internal pressure of an ideal gas vanishes.

 

This relation may be used to show the heat capacities may be expressed in terms of the heat capacity ratio and the gas constant:

Relation with degrees of freedom 
The classical equipartition theorem predicts that the heat capacity ratio for an ideal gas can be related to the thermally accessible degrees of freedom of a molecule by
 

Thus we observe that for a monatomic gas, with 3 translational degrees of freedom per atom:
 

For a diatomic gas, often 5 degrees of freedom are assumed to contribute at room temperature since each molecule has 3 translational and 2 rotational degrees of freedom, and the single vibrational degree of freedom is often not included since vibrations are often not thermally active except at high temperatures, as predicted by quantum statistical mechanics. Thus we have
 

For example, terrestrial air is primarily made up of diatomic gases (around 78% nitrogen, N2, and 21% oxygen, O2), and at standard conditions it can be considered to be an ideal gas. The above value of 1.4 is highly consistent with the measured adiabatic indices for dry air within a temperature range of 0–200 °C, exhibiting a deviation of only 0.2% (see tabulation above).

However, as mass increases and the frequency of vibrational modes decreases, vibrational degrees of freedom start to enter into the equation at far lower temperatures than is typically the case for diatomic molecules.

For a non-linear triatomic gas, such as water vapor, which has 3 translational and 3 rotational degrees of freedom, this model predicts

Real-gas relations 

As noted above, as temperature increases, higher-energy vibrational states become accessible to molecular gases, thus increasing the number of degrees of freedom and lowering . Conversely, as the temperature is lowered, rotational degrees of freedom may become unequally partitioned as well. As a result, both  and  increase with increasing temperature. 

Despite this, if the density is fairly low and intermolecular forces are negligible, the two heat capacities may still continue to differ from each other by a fixed constant (as above), which reflects the relatively constant  difference in work done during expansion for constant pressure vs. constant volume conditions. Thus, the ratio of the two values, decreases with increasing temperature. 

However, when the gas density is sufficiently high and intermolecular forces are important, thermodynamic expressions may sometimes be used to accurately describe the relationship between the two heat capacities, as explained below. Unfortunately the situation can become considerably more complex if the temperature is sufficiently high for molecules to dissociate or carry out other chemical reactions, in which case thermodynamic expressions arising from simple equations of state may not be adequate.

Thermodynamic expressions 

Values based on approximations (particularly ) are in many cases not sufficiently accurate for practical engineering calculations, such as flow rates through pipes and valves at moderate to high pressures. An experimental value should be used rather than one based on this approximation, where possible. A rigorous value for the ratio  can also be calculated by determining  from the residual properties expressed as

See relations between specific heats for the derivation of the thermodynamic relations between the heat capacities.

The above definition is the approach used to develop rigorous expressions from equations of state (such as Peng–Robinson), which match experimental values so closely that there is little need to develop a database of ratios or  values. Values can also be determined through finite-difference approximation.

Adiabatic process 

This ratio gives the important relation for an isentropic (quasistatic, reversible, adiabatic process) process of a simple compressible calorically-perfect ideal gas:

  is constant

Using the ideal gas law, :
  is constant
  is constant

In gas dynamics we are interested in the local relations between pressure, density and temperature, rather than considering a fixed quantity of gas. By considering the density  as the inverse of the volume for a unit mass, we can take  in these relations.
 

For an imperfect or non-ideal gas, Chandrasekhar defined three different adiabatic indices so that the adiabatic relations can be written in the same form as above; these are used in the theory of stellar structure:
 

See also 
 Relations between heat capacities
 Heat capacity
 Specific heat capacity
 Speed of sound
 Thermodynamic equations
 Thermodynamics
 Volumetric heat capacity

References

Notes 

Thermodynamic properties
Physical quantities
Ratios
Thought experiments in physics